Alexianne Castel (born 25 July 1990) is a French swimmer from Bordeaux. She has won gold at World Championships. Castel represented France at the 2008 and 2012 Summer Olympics.

References

External links
 
 
 
 

1990 births
Living people
French female backstroke swimmers
Swimmers at the 2008 Summer Olympics
Swimmers at the 2012 Summer Olympics
Olympic swimmers of France
Medalists at the FINA World Swimming Championships (25 m)
European Aquatics Championships medalists in swimming
Mediterranean Games gold medalists for France
Mediterranean Games bronze medalists for France
Swimmers at the 2009 Mediterranean Games
Mediterranean Games medalists in swimming
20th-century French women
21st-century French women